Sia or Sha ( []) is a village in the Nicosia District of Cyprus. It is located 4 km south of Alampra.

References

Communities in Nicosia District